50th Street Station may refer to:

New York City Subway stations:
50th Street (IND Eighth Avenue Line), in Manhattan, served by the  trains
50th Street (IRT Broadway – Seventh Avenue Line) in Manhattan, served by the  trains
47th–50th Streets – Rockefeller Center (IND Sixth Avenue Line) in Manhattan, served by the  trains
50th Street (IRT Sixth Avenue Line), a demolished station in Manhattan
50th Street (IRT Second Avenue Line), a demolished station in Manhattan
50th Street (IRT Ninth Avenue Line), a demolished station in Manhattan
50th Street (BMT West End Line) in Brooklyn, served by the  train
Bay 50th Street (BMT West End Line) in Brooklyn, served by the  train
50th Street/Minnehaha Park (Metro Transit station) in Minneapolis
50th Street/Washington station in Phoenix